34351 Decatur, provisional designation , is a Koronis asteroid from the outer region of the asteroid belt, approximately  in diameter. It was discovered on 3 September 2000, by American amateur astronomer Loren Ball at his Emerald Lane Observatory in Alabama, United States. The Q-type asteroid was named after the city of Decatur, location of the discovering observatory.

Orbit and classification 

Decatur is a member of the Koronis family,  a very large outer asteroid family with nearly co-planar ecliptical orbits. It orbits the Sun in the outer main-belt at a distance of 2.7–3.2 AU once every 5 years and 1 month (1,847 days; semi-major axis of 2.95 AU). Its orbit has an eccentricity of 0.07 and an inclination of 1° with respect to the ecliptic. The asteroid's observation arc begins 8 years prior to its official discovery observation, with a precovery taken by the Steward Observatory's Spacewatch survey at Kitt Peak in January 1992.

Naming 

This minor planet was named after the city of Decatur in the U.S. state of Alabama, location of the discovering observatory and home of the discoverer. Decatur is located near NASA's Marshall Space Flight Center. The official naming citation was published by the Minor Planet Center on 27 April 2002.

Physical characteristics 

In the SDSS-based taxonomy, Decatur is a Q-type asteroid, while members of the Koronis family are typically S-type asteroid. According to the survey carried out by the NEOWISE mission of NASA's Wide-field Infrared Survey Explorer, Decatur measures 3.54 kilometers in diameter and its surface has an albedo of 0.224.

Rotation period 

As of 2018, no rotational lightcurve of Decatur has been obtained from photometric observations. The body's rotation period, pole and shape remain unknown.

References

External links 
 Asteroid Lightcurve Database (LCDB), query form (info )
 Dictionary of Minor Planet Names, Google books
 Discovery Circumstances: Numbered Minor Planets (30001)-(35000) – Minor Planet Center
 
 

034351
Discoveries by Loren C. Ball
Named minor planets
20000903